A regional airline is a general classification of airline which typically operates scheduled passenger air service, using regional aircraft, between communities lacking sufficient demand or infrastructure to attract mainline flights. In North America, most regional airlines are classified as "fee-for-departure" carriers, operating their revenue flights as codeshare services contracted by one or more major airline partners.  A number of regional airlines, particularly during the 1960s and 1970s, were classified as commuter airlines in the Official Airline Guide (OAG).

History

Background 

Decades before the advent of jet airliners and high-speed, long-range air service, commercial aviation was structured similarly to rail transport networks.

As such, airlines structured their services along point-to-point routes with many stops between the originating and terminating air terminals. This system of air transportation effectively forced most airlines to be "regional" in nature, but the lack of distinction among carriers soon began to change with the 1929 launch of Transcontinental Air Transport (T-A-T) in the United States.  T-A-T's transcontinental "Lindbergh Line" became America's first contiguous coast-to-coast air service, and it ushered in a new era of major airlines expanding to operate networks with large footprints.  The development of long-range aircraft operated by flag carriers like British Overseas Airways Corporation and Trans-Canada Airlines further normalized the capability of "far and wide" air travel among the traveling public.

Early growth 
As flag carriers grew to fill the demand of long-range passenger traffic, new and small airlines found niches flying between short and under-served routes to-and-from major airports and more rural destinations.  Through the 1960s and 1970s, war surplus designs (notably, the Douglas DC-3) were replaced by higher-performance turboprop or jet-powered designs like the Fokker F27 Friendship and BAC One-Eleven. This extended the range of the regionals dramatically, causing a wave of consolidations between the now overlapping airlines.

In the United States, regional airlines were an important building block of today's passenger air system.  The U.S. Government encouraged the forming of regional airlines to provide services from smaller communities to larger towns, where air passengers could connect to a larger network.

Some of the original regional airlines (then known as "Local Service Airlines") sanctioned by the Civil Aeronautics Board in the 1940s and 1950s include:

 Allegheny Airlines
 Bonanza Air Lines
 Central Airlines
 Frontier Airlines
 Lake Central Airlines
 Mohawk Airlines
 North Central Airlines
 Ozark Airlines
 Pacific Air Lines
 Piedmont Airlines
 Southern Airways
 Southwest Airways (renamed Pacific Air Lines in 1958)
 Trans-Texas Airways
 West Coast Airlines

None of these airlines survive today; some airlines use these names today but are not the direct successors to the original airlines. A history and study of regional airlines was published by the Smithsonian Institution Press in 1994 under the title Commuter Airlines of the United States, by R.E.G. Davies and I. E. Quastler.

Deregulation era 
Since the Airline Deregulation Act of 1978, the US federal government has continued support of the regional airline sector to ensure many of the smaller and more isolated rural communities remain connected to air services. This is encouraged with the Essential Air Service program that subsidizes airline service to smaller U.S. communities and suburban centers, aiming to maintain year-round service.

Although regional airlines in the United States are often viewed as small, not particularly lucrative "no name" subsidiaries of the mainline airlines, in terms of revenue, many would be designated major airline carrier status based on the only actual definition of "major airline," in the United States, the definition from the U.S. Department of Transportation. This definition is based solely on annual revenue and not on any other criterion such as average aircraft seating capacity, pilot pay, or number of aircraft in the fleet. It is common in the U.S. to incorrectly associate aircraft size with the Department of Transportation's designation of major, national, and regional airline. The only corollary is the Regional Airline Association, an industry trade group, defines "regional airlines" generally as "...operat(ing) short and medium haul scheduled airline service connecting smaller communities with larger cities and connecting hubs. The airlines' fleet primarily consists of 19 to 68 seat turboprops and 30 to 100 seat regional jets." To be clear there is no distinction in the Department of Transportation definition of major, national and regional airlines by aircraft size. The definition is based on revenue. The clash of definitions has led to confusion in the media and the public.

1990s–2000s 
Beginning around 1985, a number of trends have become apparent. Regional aircraft are getting larger, faster, and are flying longer ranges. Additionally, the vast majority of regionals within the United States with more than ten aircraft within their fleet, have lost their individual identities and now serve only as feeders, to Alaska Airlines, American Airlines,  Delta Air Lines, or United Airlines major hubs. Regional  aircraft in the US have been getting slightly more comfortable with the addition of better ergonomically designed aircraft cabins, and the addition of varying travel classes aboard these aircraft.  From small, less than 50-seat "single-class cabin" turboprop, to turbofan regional jet equipment, present day regional airlines provide aircraft such as the higher capacity CRJ700, CRJ900, CRJ1000 series of aircraft and the somewhat larger fuselage Embraer E-Jets.  Some of these newer aircraft are capable of flying longer distances with comfort levels that rival and surpass the regional airline equipment of the past.

In the early 1990s, much more advanced turboprop-powered, fuel efficient, and passenger friendly DC-3 type replacement projects such as the 19 passenger Embraer/FMA CBA 123 Vector and the 34 seat Dornier 328 were undertaken, but met little financial success, partly due to economic downturn in the airline industry resulting from the outbreak of hostilities when Iraq invaded Kuwait. Many of the regional airlines  operating turboprop equipment such as Delta's regional sister Comair airlines in the United States set the course for bypassing entirely the regional turboprops as they became the first to transition to an all-jet regional jet fleet.  To a lesser extent in Europe and the United Kingdom this transition, to  notably the Embraer or Canadair designs, was well advanced by the late  1990s. This evolution towards jet equipment, brought the independent regional airlines into direct competition with the major airlines, forcing additional consolidation.

To improve on their market penetration, larger airline holding companies rely on operators of smaller aircraft to provide service or added frequency service to some airports. Such airlines, often operating in code-share arrangements with mainline airlines, often completely repaint  their aircraft fleet in the mainline airline's sub-brand livery.  For example, United Express regional airline partner CommutAir branded its entire fleet as United Express.  On the other hand, regional airline Gulfstream International Airlines did not brand their aircraft. When Colgan Air was still operating, they branded a handful of aircraft as Colgan Air, but most were branded as Continental Connection, US Airways Express or United Express, with whom it had contractual agreements.

Business model
21st century regional airlines are commonly organized in one of two ways.

Independent model 
Operating as an independent airline under their own brand, mostly providing service to small and isolated towns, for whom the airline is the only reasonable link to a larger town. Examples of this are PenAir, which links the remote Aleutian Islands to Anchorage, Alaska, and Mokulele Airlines, which operates in the Hawaiian islands.

Fee-for-departure (contract) model 
As an affiliated airline, contracting with a major airline, operating under their brand name (for example, Endeavor Air operates flights under the Delta Connection brand name for Delta Air Lines), and filling two roles: delivering passengers to the major airline's hubs from surrounding towns, and increasing frequency of service on mainline routes during times when demand does not warrant use of large aircraft, known as commuter flights.

One of the first independently owned and managed airlines in the world that rebranded its aircraft to match a larger airline's brand was Air Alpes of France. During 1974, Air Alpes painted its newly delivered short range regional jets in the livery of Air France.

 NLM's KLM style branding does however pre-date the Air France efforts though by a number of years.

The success of the "rebranding" or "pseudo branding" of a much smaller airline into the name recognition of a much larger one soon became clear as passenger numbers soared at Air Alpes, and it was soon decided to paint other aircraft such as the Fokker F-27 into full Air France colours as well.

Many airline passengers find sub-branding very confusing, while many other airline passengers are content to think they are on a mainline or flagship airline's aircraft, while in actuality they are far from it. Sub-branding is pretty consistent throughout the airline industry of the United States, with all the regional airlines, mainline airlines, and the regional airline holding companies, as well as the mainline airlines holding companies participating.

Industry

Labor relations

On Feb 12th, 2010, a year after the crash of Colgan flight 3407, Frontline premiered its WGA Award-winning exposé on the industry entitled "Flying Cheap". In the program, reporter Miles O'Brien questioned how the impact of low salaries are having on pilot psyches and how safe this could be for the flying public. When asked to respond to the question, Roger Cohen, president of the Regional Airline Association, told Frontline that, "...there are many other people who earn less money than that and work more days in these communities that can afford it and do it and do it responsibly."

Future
An alternative to some regional airline service may be the new Small Aircraft Transportation System initiative in conjunction with general aviation and VLJs (very light jets). With the introduction of air taxi services and very light jets, city pair links to smaller communities lacking regional connections could become more common.

In many regions, regional airlines increasingly face competition from high-speed rail with airlines sometimes replacing feeder services through air rail alliances.

Current regional airline brands 

Aer Lingus Regional
Aeromexico Connect
Air Canada Express
Air Europa Express
Air India Regional
Air New Zealand Link
Alaska Horizon
Alitalia CityLiner
AnadoluJet
American Eagle
Azul Conecta
BA CityFlyer
Cayman Airways Express
Delta Connection
Fiji Link
HOP!
Iberia Regional
J-Air
KLM Cityhopper
LATAM Express
Lufthansa Regional
Moçambique Expresso
PAL Express
Porter Airlines
QantasLink
TAP Express
Tunisair Express
United Express
Virgin Australia Regional Airlines
WestJet Encore
WestJet Link

Current regional airlines

North America

In North America, regional airlines are operated primarily to bring passengers to the major hubs, where they will connect for longer-distance flights on the national airlines also known as flagship carriers. The smallest regional carriers have become known as feeder airlines. The separate corporate structure allows the company to operate under different pay schedules, typically paying much less than their mainline owners.

Many large North American airlines, have established operational relationships with one or more regional airline companies. Their aircraft often use the aircraft livery for the company they are operating flights for.  These airlines can be subsidiaries of the major airline or fly under a code sharing agreement or operating through capacity purchase agreements, with the mainline parent company financing the aircraft for the regional airline, and then placing the aircraft with the regional for very little cost. An example would be Envoy Air, which is fully owned by American Airlines Group and does business as American Eagle.

Many of these large regional airlines have joined the lobbying group Regional Airline Association. This association lobbies purely for the financial interest of the corporate bodies it constitutes, not the employees of those airlines.

Canada 
In Canada there are a number of regional airlines. Some of them focus on Canadian Arctic and First Nations communities, while others operate regional flights on behalf of a larger carrier, similar to their American counterparts. Some of these airlines and brands include:
 Air Canada Express operated by Jazz
 Air Creebec
 Air Tindi
 Bearskin Airlines
 Canadian North
 Pacific Coastal Airlines
 Pascan Aviation
 Perimeter Aviation
 Porter Airlines
 Wasaya Airways
 WestJet Encore (operating for WestJet)

United States 
The trend of branding smaller and mostly regional (in terms of geographical scope) airlines to match the mainline airlines, has led to only four main sub-brands in the United States: Alaska Horizon/Alaska SkyWest, American Eagle, Delta Connection and United Express. They are the post-deregulation survivors of the multiple bankruptcies and mergers of the major, legacy, mainline airlines.

These regional brands are a form of a virtual airline, with the regional airline paid to staff, operate and maintain aircraft used on flights that are scheduled, marketed and sold by a partner mainline airline. This practice allows the mainline carrier to use outsourced labor at smaller stations, to reduce costs. In 2011, 61% of all advertised flights for American, Delta, United and US Airways were operated by their regional brands. This figure was only 40% in 2000.

Regional airlines
The formerly small regional airlines have grown substantially, through mergers or by the use of a holding company, as pioneered by AMR Corporation in 1982. AMR created the AMR Eagle Holding Corporation which unified its wholly owned American Eagle Airlines and Executive Airlines under one division, but still maintained the regional airlines' operating certificates and personnel separate from each other and American Airlines.

The most significant regional airlines in the United States, are:

Mainline carrier-owned
 Alaska Air Group
 Horizon Air
American Airlines Group
 Envoy Air
 Piedmont Airlines
 PSA Airlines
Delta Air Lines
 Endeavor Air

Independent contractors
 Air Wisconsin
 CommutAir
 GoJet Airlines
 Mesa Airlines
 Republic Airways
 SkyWest Airlines

Smaller commuter airlines
The evolution and chronological history of the commuter side of the regional airline industry can be defined by a number of dates prior to the end of the era of airline regulation by the Civil Aeronautics Board of the United States.  Among these significant dates are:

 1967 – CAB makes exemption for airlines, starting with the local service carrier Allegheny Airlines; to suspend operating a route with large aircraft due to a lack of passenger traffic to do so profitably, provided the airline operating the CAB awarded route substitutes its operation with other equipment and maintains responsibility the route is served.  As such this "exemption" allowed the development of the Allegheny Commuter System and the subcontracting of Henson Airlines to fulfill Allegheny's CAB route award obligations.
 1977 – Official list of U.S. Commuter Airlines in the year prior to airline deregulation
 1978 and onwards the airline industry was officially deregulated by the Airline Deregulation Act of 1978
 1981 – the United States governmental lobbying body of this industry, known as the Commuter Airline Association, changes its name to the Regional Airline Association.

List of Commuter Airlines in 1977 Prior to Airline Deregulation:

 Air Carolina
 Air Midwest
 Air New England
 Air Wisconsin
 Alaska Aeronautical
 Altair Airlines
 Antilles Air Boats
 Atlantic City Airlines
 Bar Harbor Airlines
 Cascade Airways
 Cochise Airlines
 Cumberland Airlines
 Execuair Airlines
 Florida Airlines
 Golden West Airlines
 Metro Airlines
 Midstate Airlines
 New England Airlines
 Pilgrim Airlines
 Puerto Rico International Airlines
 Rio Airways
 Rocky Mountain Airways
 Royal Hawaiian Airways
 Scenic Airlines
 Seaplane Shuttle
 Sky West Aviation
 SMB Stagelines 
 Swift Aire Lines 
 Suburban Airlines
 Transport Catalina Airlines
 Tyee Airlines
 Zia Airlines

Some of the lesser known smaller brands used by the regional airlines and their parent companies were:

 PWExpress, a regional airline brand of the regional airline named Pacific Wings, IATA code (LW) which is owned by Pacific Air Holdings company
 New Mexico Airlines, a regional airline brand of Pacific Wings, which is owned by Pacific Air Holdings company
 Nantucket Airlines, a brand operated by regional airline Cape Air which is wholly owned by the regional airline holding company Hyannis Air Service.
 Ravn Connect, a commuter /air taxi brand operated by the regional airlines owned by the HoTH parent company in association with Corvus Airlines which operates under the Ravn Alaska marketing brand and is also owned by  HoTH.

Europe 

European regional airlines serve the intra-continental sector in Europe.  They connect cities to major airports and to other cities, avoiding the need for passengers to make transfers.

For example, BA CityFlyer a regional subsidiary of British Airways uses the basic Chatham Dockyard Union Flag livery of its parent company and flies between domestic and European cities.

Some of Europe's regional airlines are subsidiaries of national air carriers, though there remains a strong entrepreneurial sector of independents. They are based on business models ranging from the traditional full service airline to low cost carriers. Innovations include one where the passenger is required to join a membership club before being allowed to fly.

Some examples of European regional airlines include:

Air Dolomiti
Air France Hop
Air Nostrum
 Alitalia CityLiner
 Aurigny
BA CityFlyer
 Blue Islands
CityJet
 Eastern Airways
KLM Cityhopper
Loganair
Lufthansa CityLine
TAP Express
Twin Jet

Asia 
India
India has many regional carriers operating currently. Some of these operate under the government's UDAN (Regional Connectivity Scheme).

 Alliance Air, a subsidiary of India's state-owned flag carrier, Air India.
 Air Deccan 
 Air Odisha
 Air Carnival
 Air Costa
 Air Pegasus
 TruJet
Thailand
Bangkok Airways has won World's Best Regional Airline from Skytrax three years in a row in 2015, 2016 and 2017
Thai Smile

Australia 
Australia has an association for regional airline, the Regional Aviation of Australia. More than 2 million passengers and 23 million kg of cargo are involved each year.
 Airlines of Tasmania
 Airnorth
 Alliance Airlines
 FlyPelican
 Fly Tiwi
 King Island Airlines
 QantasLink, the regional arm of Qantas
 Regional Express Airlines (Rex), the largest regional airline outside of the Qantas group in Australia, servicing routes in several states and territories.
 Sharp Airlines
 Skytrans Airlines
 Virgin Australia Regional Airlines

Former regional airlines
Post airline deregulation, airlines sought added market share and to do this they sought partnerships with regional and small airlines to feed traffic into the airline hub.

Initially these tie ups tended to use small 15 -19 seat aircraft, which did not have a reputation of passenger comfort, or safe reliable operations, by small often under capitalized tiny airline operators.

To create a common tie and what appeared to be seamless to the air traveler, major carriers marketed in advertising and soon had much smaller airlines paint their small and what was often described as puddle-jumper aircraft, in the image and branding colors of the much larger mainline partner. This was to give the appearance of reliability. Over time these regional aircraft grew in size as airline hubs expanded and competition dwindled among the major carriers.

Below is a list of many of the regional brands that evolved when regional airlines were advertised to look like the major airlines.

Marketing brands with regional-type aircraft 
The following is a list of former regional marketing brands operated by lesser known airlines, serving airline hub regional routes on behalf of mainline, legacy, major, or large discount carriers in the United States:

 Air Florida Commuter
 AirTran JetConnect
 Allegheny Commuter
 Aloha Island Air
 America West Express
 American Inter-Island
 AmericanConnection
 ATA Connection
 Braniff Express
 Continental Connection
 Continental Express
 Eastern Atlantis Express
 Eastern Express ops by (AJC) (AMD) (PBA) (PRE)
 Eastern Metro Express
 Frontier Commuter (Combs Airways – ITR Airlines)
 Frontier Express
 Frontier JetExpress
 Grand Connection (Alpha Air)
 MarkAir Express
 Midway Connection
 Midwest Connect
 New York Air Connection
 Northwest Airlink
 Ozark Midwest
 Pan Am Express (an airline formerly known as Ransome Airlines, acquired by Pan Am in 1987)
 Piedmont Commuter
 Reno Air Express
 Trans World Express
 TranStar Sky Link
 TW Express (TWE)
 TWA Connection
 US Airways Express, being replaced by American Eagle as US Airways merges with American Airlines
 Western Express (OO)

Marketing brands with mainline branding / mainline-type aircraft but operated by regional airlines
The following is a list of former marketing brands operated by smaller airlines, but using larger traditionally non-regional-type equipment such as the Boeing 727, Douglas DC9, Fokker F28, Embraer 190 E-jets, or BAE 146, serving airline hub regional routes on behalf of mainline, legacy, major, or large discount carriers, in the United States:
 Continental Airlines operated by Royale Airlines
 Continental Jet Express
 Continental's Houston Proud Express
 Frontier Airlines operated by Lynx Aviation
 Frontier Airlines operated by Republic Airlines
 Northwest Jet AirLink
 Midwest (ops by Republic Airlines even after Midwest Airlines is shuttered)
 Pan Am Clipper Connection (Boston-Maine Airways, a true regional airline within the Pan Am Systems airline and transportation conglomerate, tried to run a fully certificated mainline airline as nothing more than a distinct internal marketing brand of a regional airline.)
 Pan Am Express (1981–1991, consisting of several airlines contracted to operate regional flights on behalf of Pan Am)

See also 
 List of commercial short-haul civilian passenger "regional" airliners
 List of commercial short-haul civilian passenger "regional jet" airliners

References

External links 
 Regional Airline Association (US)
 Regional Airline Partners (US) 
 European Regions Airline Association (EU)
 Regional Aviation Association of Australia (Aus)
 Frontline – Flying Cheap – February 9, 2010. One year after the deadly crash of Continental 3407, FRONTLINE investigate the safety issues associated with regional airlines.

Airline types